Muntinlupa station is a railway station located on the South Main Line in Muntinlupa, Metro Manila, Philippines. The old station was removed together with the I.S. during the clearing operations in 2009. The new station was supposed to be constructed years earlier which was within the proposed Phase 2 of the Northrail-Southrail Linkage Project that should have rehabilitated and double tracked the South Main Line from Sucat to Calamba. The new station's construction started and got finished only on 2013 without the track duplication of the line. The new station was formally opened on December 23, 2013. This station is planned to be the new terminus of the Metro Commuter although there is no confirmation and no specific date yet given by PNR.

The station is the seventeenth station southbound from Tutuban and is one of three stations serving Muntinlupa, the others being Sucat, Alabang and previously Tunasan.

Philippine National Railways stations
Railway stations in Metro Manila
Railway stations opened in 2013
Buildings and structures in Muntinlupa